"Move Move Move (The Red Tribe)" is a single released by Manchester United F.C. on 22 April 1996. The single features the squad that reached the 1996 FA Cup Final. It peaked at #6 in the UK Singles Chart and re-entered the chart at #50, three months later.

Charts

Weekly charts

Year-end charts

References

1996 singles
Manchester United F.C. songs
1996 songs
Song articles with missing songwriters